Sabane may refer to:

Sabanê language, Brazil
Sabane Station, Iwate, Japan

See also 

 Saban (disambiguation)